IU Michael A. Carroll Track & Soccer Stadium is a 12,100-seat soccer and track and field stadium located in Indianapolis, Indiana, United States.  It is the home of the Indiana University-Purdue University Indianapolis Jaguars track and field and soccer teams. It was also the original home of the Indy Eleven.

The stadium is named for Indianapolis civic leader Michael A. Carroll. The stadium was built in 1982 for $7 million as a track and field venue. The facility has hosted the Athletics Competitions of the 1987 Pan American Games, 2001 World Police and Fire Games, several USA Outdoor Track and Field Championships and NCAA Championships as well as the 1988 US Olympic Trials where Florence Griffith-Joyner set the women's 100 metres world record of 10.49 that stands to this day.  The site features a 400-meter Mondo track with eight lanes.

The stadium was renovated in 2013–2014 to accommodate the Indy Eleven. As part of the Indy Eleven's move to the United Soccer League in 2018, the team moved to Lucas Oil Stadium but returned for the 2019 playoff season.

References

External links

 
North American Soccer League stadiums
IUPUI Jaguars
College soccer venues in the United States
Soccer venues in Indiana
Sports venues in Indianapolis
Athletics (track and field) venues in Indiana
College track and field venues in the United States
Pan American Games athletics venues